Rural management is the study of planning, organising, directing, and controlling of rural areas, co-operatives, agribusiness and related fields.

External links 

 MS Sriram: Rural Management Education in India- A Retrospect IIM- Ahmedabad-2007
Arun Kumar. Rural Management Education in India- A Restrospect. IIM-Lucknow- 2014
KIIT School of Rural Management (KSRM), Bhubaneswar which came into existence with the laying of the foundation stone by the father of the White Revolution, Late Dr. Verghese Kurien & Dr. Achyuta Samanta offering MBA (Rural Management) course: http://www.ksrm.ac.in/
KSRM Celebrating the 95th Birth Anniversary of the Legendary Dr. Verghese Kurien
Changing Structure of Rural Economy of India -Implications for Employment and Growth- NITI Aayog
Rural Marketing is Real Marketing
International Journal of Rural Management- international journal that focuses exclusively on rural management
Social Change in Rural India
Ministry of Rural Development, Government of India

Management education